The Mousterian (or Mode III) is an archaeological industry of stone tools, associated primarily with the Neanderthals in Europe, and to the earliest anatomically modern humans in North Africa and West Asia. The Mousterian largely defines the latter part of the Middle Paleolithic, the middle of the West Eurasian Old Stone Age. It lasted roughly from 160,000 to 40,000 BP. If its predecessor, known as Levallois or Levallois-Mousterian, is included, the range is extended to as early as  300,000–200,000 BP. The main following period is the Aurignacian (c. 43,000–28,000 BP) of Homo sapiens.

Naming
The culture was named after the type site of Le Moustier, three superimposed rock shelters in the Dordogne region of France. Similar flintwork has been found all over unglaciated Europe and also the Near East and North Africa. Handaxes, racloirs, and points constitute the industry; sometimes a Levallois technique or another prepared-core technique was employed in making the flint flakes.

Characteristics

The European Mousterian is the product of Neanderthals. It existed roughly from 160,000 to 40,000 BP. 
Some assemblages, namely those from Pech de l'Aze, include exceptionally small points prepared using the Levallois technique among other prepared core types, causing some researchers to suggest that these flakes take advantage of greater grip strength possessed by Neanderthals.

In North Africa and the Near East, Mousterian tools were produced by anatomically modern humans. In the Eastern Mediterranean, for example, assemblages produced by Neanderthals are indistinguishable from those made by Qafzeh type modern humans. The Mousterian industry in North Africa is estimated to be 315,000 years old.

Possible variants are Denticulate, Charentian (Ferrassie & Quina) named after the Charente region, Typical, and the Mousterian Traditional Acheulian (MTA) Type-A and Type-B. The industry continued alongside the new Châtelperronian industry during the 45,000-40,000 BP period.

Locations

Mousterian artifacts have been found in Haua Fteah in Cyrenaica and other sites in Northwest Africa.
Contained within a cave in the Syria region, along with a Neanderthaloid skeleton.
Located in the Haibak valley of Afghanistan.
Zagros and Central Iran

The archaeological site of Atapuerca, Spain, contains Mousterian objects.
Gorham's Cave in Gibraltar contains Mousterian objects.
Uzbekistan has sites of Mousterian culture, including Teshik-Tash.
Turkmenistan also has Mousterian relics.
Siberia has many sites with Mousterian-style implements, e.g. Denisova Cave.
Israel is one of the places where remains of both Neandertals and Homo sapiens sapiens have been found in association with Mousterian artifacts.
Lynford Quarry near Mundford, Norfolk, England, has yielded Mousterian tools.
The archaeological cave site of Azykh contains Mousterian relics in the overlying strata. In this cave, a lower jaw of a hominid named Azykhantrop has been found. It is supposed that this finding belongs to a pre-neanderthal species.
The most important sites with significant Neanderthal and Mousterian finds in Croatia are Krapina, Vindija, Velika pećina and Veternica, located in the north-western part of Croatia and the region of Hrvatsko zagorje. Mousterian industry sites on Istrian peninsula are Romualdova pećina and an open-air site at Campanož. Sites on the Adriatic coast and its hinterland are Mujina pećina, with a Mousterian stratigraphic sequence, and Velika pećina in Kličevica with finds approximately 40,000 years old that are late Mousterian. An underwater Mousterian excavation site at Kaštel Štafilić - Resnik recovered about 100 artefacts of which half are tools, Mousterian centripetal cores and side scrapers, several pseudotools, numerous pieces of chert and Levallois method artifacts. Other underwater Paleolithic finds are a single Mousterian tool offshore of Povljana on the island of Pag and stone tools of possible Mousterian type at a depth of 3 m at Stipanac in Lake Prokljan. In the area north of the town of Zadar an extensive series of sites exist where usually small Micro-mousterian industry tools, denticulates and notched pieces are found.

See also

Neanderthal extinction hypotheses
Levallois technique

References

External links

 
Archaeological cultures of Africa
Archaeological cultures of Asia
Archaeological cultures of Europe
Paleolithic cultures of Europe
Middle Paleolithic
Neanderthals
Industries (archaeology)